The 1992 York City Councils elections were held in May 1992 to elect members of York City Council in North Yorkshire, England. Fifteen seats, previously contested in 1988, were up for election: eleven were won by the Labour Party, three by the Conservative Party and one by the Liberal Democrats.  The Labour Party retained overall control of the council; the composition of the council after the election was: Labour Party 34 seats, Conservative Party seven seats and Liberal Democrats four seats.

Election results

Ward results

Acomb Ward

Beckfield Ward

Bishophill Ward

Bootham Ward

Clifton Ward

Fishergate Ward

Foxwood Ward

*In 1988, the seat was won by the SDP–Liberal Alliance. The members of the alliance, the Social Democratic Party (SDP) and the Liberal Party, merged in 1988 to become the Liberal Democrats.

Guildhall Ward

Heworth Ward

Holgate Ward

Knavesmire Ward

Micklegate Ward

Monk Ward

Walmgate Ward

Westfield Ward

* In 1988, the seat was won by the SDP–Liberal Alliance. The members of the alliance, the Social Democratic Party (SDP) and the Liberal Party, merged in 1988 to become the Liberal Democrats.

References

City of York Council elections
1992 English local elections
1990s in York